So Natural may refer to:

 So Natural (Lisa Stansfield album), 1993
 "So Natural" (song), a 1993 song by Lisa Stansfield
 So Natural (Salvador album), 2004
 So Natural (brand), a food brand